The Corner painters in Denmark first came together in 1932 when they decided to hold an exhibition in a meeting hall inside an office building on the corner of Vester Voldgade and Studiestræde in the centre of Copenhagen. The group was soon referred to simply as Corner.

Among its earlier members were Karl Bovin, Victor Brockdorff, Povl Christensen, Kaj Ejstrup, Lauritz Hartz, Alfred Simonsen, Viggo Rørup and Erik Raadal.

Today, with its 49 members, it is the second largest artists association in Denmark. Regular exhibitions are still held, attracting thousands of visitors. The artists themselves are made up of painters, sculptors, photographers and musicians. They meet regularly and arrange annual exhibitions which attract large numbers of visitors.

See also
 Art of Denmark

References

External links
 Official website

Danish art